Harbour of Tears is a studio concept album by English progressive rock band Camel. It tells the story of an Irish family who are painfully separated as their young ones depart to the United States to seek a better future. Released in 1996, it was their twelfth studio album.

Title and lyrics 

Band vocalist and guitarist Andrew Latimer learned that the last sight of Ireland his grandmother's family would have seen was Cóbh Harbour, a deep-water port that witnessed the fracturing of thousands of families as their sons and daughters departed towards America. Thus the album was titled as the common alias of the port, 'Harbour of Tears'.

Track listing 
All songs written by Andy Latimer and Susan Hoover, except where noted.

 "Irish Air" (Traditional Gaelic) – 0:57
 "Irish Air" (Instrumental Reprise) (Latimer) – 1:57
 "Harbour of Tears" – 3:13
 "Cóbh" (Latimer) – 0:51
 "Send Home the Slates" – 4:23
 "Under the Moon" (Latimer) – 1:16
 "Watching the Bobbins" – 7:14
 "Generations" (Latimer) – 1:02
 "Eyes of Ireland" – 3:09
 "Running from Paradise" (Latimer) – 5:21
 "End of the Day" – 2:29
 "Coming of Age" (Latimer) – 7:22
 "The Hour Candle (A Song for My Father)" (Latimer) – 23:00 (song ends at 6:30, afterwards a hidden track begins; after 8:03 the hidden track shifts into low-volume wind sounds until 23:00)

Personnel 
Andy Latimer – Guitars, Flute, Keyboards, Vocals, Penny Whistle
Colin Bass – Bass guitar, backing vocals
Mickey Simmonds – Keyboards

Additional musicians
John Xepoleas – Drums
David Paton – Bass, lead vocals on "Send Home the Slates"
Mae McKenna – A Capella vocal on "Irish Air"
Neil Panton – Oboe, Soprano sax, Harmonium
Barry Phillips – Cello
John Burton – French horn
James SK Wān – Bamboo flute
Karen Bentley – Violin
Anita Stoneham – Violin

Other credits
Mixed by Andy Latimer and Colin Bass
Sleeve design by Jon Storey

Charts

References

 The Rough Guide to Rock. (2003). United Kingdom: Rough Guides. p.165

1996 albums
Camel (band) albums
Concept albums
Works about human migration